Group Therapy is the second studio album by British progressive trance group Above & Beyond. It was released on 6 June 2011 by Anjunabeats. The album features collaborations with Zoë Johnston and Richard Bedford.

Track listing
Arranged and produced by Above & Beyond. Additional production by Andrew Bayer.

(*) denotes additional production

Limited Edition Collector's Book 
At a one-time pressing of 1,000 copies, the Group Therapy Collector's Book was hand-signed by Above & Beyond members Jono, Tony and Paavo and included:
40-page hardback book with handwritten lyrics, images and sleeve notes
Group Therapy album disc
Bonus disc with Above & Beyond TV content, music videos of "Sun & Moon" and "Thing Called Love" and a 30-minute interview with the band

Charts

Release history

References

External links
Official website

2011 albums
Above & Beyond (band) albums
Anjunabeats albums